Kilmanagh may refer to:

 Kilnamanagh Lower, Ireland
 Kilnamanagh Upper, Ireland
 Kilmanagh, Ontario, Canada
 Kilmanagh, Michigan, USA